Attila Szabó (born July 16, 1984 in Budapest) is a male decathlete from Hungary. He twice won the men's national title in the decathlon: 2007 and 2009.

He received a one-year doping ban due to failing the whereabouts rule on three occasions, beginning January 2014.

Achievements

References

1984 births
Living people
Hungarian decathletes
Athletes from Budapest
Athletes (track and field) at the 2012 Summer Olympics
Olympic athletes of Hungary
Doping cases in athletics
Hungarian sportspeople in doping cases
Universiade medalists in athletics (track and field)
Universiade bronze medalists for Hungary
Medalists at the 2009 Summer Universiade